The Make My Day Card Game (also known as MMDCG) is a 1987 card game designed by William Hollifield. The game has some similarities to Gin Rummy and takes about an hour to play.

Publication history
The Make My Day Card Game is a card game in which each player is a world leader competing against the others for power.

Reception
Stewart Wieck reviewed The Make My Day Card Game in the December 1988 issue of White Wolf Magazine noting that, "while it is not particularly strategy-dominated or mindarresting, MMDCG is fun and could be a good choice for the political minded, or those who simply enjoy a good card game".

References

Card games introduced in 1987